Anchinia is a genus of gelechioid moths.

Taxonomy
In some systematic layouts, it is placed in the subfamily Amphisbatinae of the concealer moth family (Oecophoridae). Delimitation of Amphisbatinae versus the closely related Depressariinae and Oecophorinae is a major problem of Gelechioidea taxonomy and systematics, and some authors separate the former two as full-blown families (Amphisbatidae and Depressariidae), and/or include the Amphisbatinae in Depressariinae (or Depressariidae), or merge them in the Oecophorinae outright.

Species
The species of Anchinia are:
Anchinia cristalis (Scopoli, 1763)
Anchinia daphnella (Denis & Schiffermuller, 1775)
Anchinia furculata Meyrick, 1925
Anchinia grandis Stainton, 1867
Anchinia grisescens Frey, 1856
Anchinia laureolella Herrich-Schaffer, 1854
Anchinia oenochares Meyrick, 1924
Anchinia orientalis Caradja, 1939
Anchinia porphyritica Meyrick, 1914

Footnotes

References
 Fauna Europaea (FE) (2009): Pseudatemelia. Version 2.1, 2009-DEC-22. Retrieved 2012-JAN-27.
 Pitkin, Brian & Jenkins, Paul (2004): Butterflies and Moths of the World, Generic Names and their Type-species – Anchinia. Version of 2004-NOV-05. Retrieved 2012-JAN-27.
 Savela, Markku (2001): Markku Savela's Lepidoptera and some other life forms – Anchinia. Version of 2001-NOV-07. Retrieved 2012-JAN-27.

 
Hypercalliinae